The Coco River is a river in southern Honduras and northern Nicaragua.

The Coco River or Rio Coco may refer also to:

 Coco River (Araguaia River), a river of Tocantins, Brazil
 Coco River (Puerto Rico), a river of Puerto Rico
Cocó River (Ceará state), river on the coast of Brazil